Lambada embroidery (lambadi embroidery, Lambani, Sandur Lambani embroidery, Banjara embroidery, lepo) is an art of embellishing clothes practiced by the Lambadas or Lambanis, the tribe in Sanduru, the Banjaras of Bellary and Bijapur in Karnataka, Hyderabad in Andhra Pradesh. Lambada embroidery consists of the patchwork, appliqué, beadwork and embroidery together.

Technique 
Lambada embroidery uses a combination of stitches and appliqué, along with mirror work and other embellishments. Tribal women use coins, shells, buttons, cowries and small pieces of mirrors to decorate their colorful costumes, such as phetiya (skirt) and kanchali or (blouse). The motifs are mainly geometrical with grid like patterns.

Recognition 
The clothes decorated with Lambada embroidery work are admired in foreign. Sandur Lambani embroidery has now found a place in the products with the Geographical indication (GI) tag in the country. The tribes may benefit from the recognization.

Use 
Otherthan Lamabani costumes, the art is explored with a variety of products like cushion covers, bedcovers, wall hangings, garments and accessories like bags, headbands, waist belts etc.

Gallery

References 

Embroidery in India
Embroidery
Embroidery by country